Clarence Brown (1890–1987) was an American film director.

Clarence Brown may also refer to:
 Clarence Brown (baseball), Negro league baseball player
 Clarence J. Brown (1893–1965), Ohio congressman
 Bud Brown (politician) (1927–2022), Ohio congressman, son and successor to the above
 Clancy Brown (born 1959), American actor and voice actor, grandson and son to the above
 Clarence John Brown (1895–1973), U.S. Navy Vice Admiral
 Clarence "Gatemouth" Brown (1924–2005), American R&B singer
  (1929–2015), professor of Russian literature and comparative literature from Princeton University